Frederick Joseph Bernard McEvoy (3 November 1913 – 15 March 1982) was an Australian rules footballer who played with Footscray in the Victorian Football League (VFL).

McEvoy later served in the Austrlaian Army during World War II, serving two stints in Papua New Guinea.

References

External links 		
		

1913 births
1982 deaths
Australian rules footballers from Melbourne
Western Bulldogs players
People from Werribee, Victoria
Australian Army personnel of World War II
Military personnel from Melbourne